Tony Gibson (born October 12, 1972) is an American football coach who currently serves as the defensive coordinator and linebackers coach at North Carolina State University. He was previously the defensive coordinator at West Virginia and assistant head coach at Michigan.

College years
Gibson attended Glenville State from 1991 to 1994 where he played as a defensive back, winning two WVIAC  championships.

Coaching career
Gibson got his start in college coaching at his alma mater as a defensive backs coach. In 2001, he broke into the FBS ranks as the defensive backs coach at West Virginia, a job he would hold until 2007. In 2008, when West Virginia head coach Rich Rodriguez was hired to the same job at Michigan, he brought Gibson with him to serve as assistant head coach, special teams and defensive backs coach. Gibson, was fired alongside Rodriguez from Michigan following the 2010 season. He then spent one year stints at Pitt and Arizona in a variety of roles before returning to West Virginia in 2013 as the Safeties  coach before being promoted to defensive coordinator in 2014. Following West Virginia head coach Dana Holgorsen's departure in 2019, new head coach Neal Brown chose not to keep Gibson as the teams defensive coordinator. In 2019, Gibson was hired as the defensive coordinator for NC State.

Personal life
Gibson and his wife have two children.

References

External links
 NC State profile

1972 births
Living people
NC State Wolfpack football coaches
West Virginia Mountaineers football coaches
Michigan Wolverines football coaches
Coaches of American football from West Virginia
People from Boone County, West Virginia
Glenville State Pioneers football players